The following is the discography of the industrial music group Throbbing Gristle.

Discography

Albums
 The Second Annual Report (1977 Industrial Records)
 D.o.A: The Third and Final Report of Throbbing Gristle (1978 Industrial Records)
 20 Jazz Funk Greats (1979 Industrial Records)
 Journey Through a Body (1982 Walter Ulbricht Schallfolien)
 In the Shadow of the Sun (1984 Illuminated Records)
 CD1 (1986 Mute)
 TG Now (2004 Mute)
 Part Two: The Endless Not (2007 Mute)
 The Third Mind Movements (2009 Industrial Records)

Singles
 "United/Zyklon B Zombie" (1978 Industrial Records)
 "We Hate You (Little Girls)/Five Knuckle Shuffle" (1979 Sordide Sentimental)
 "Subhuman/Something Came Over Me" (1980 Industrial Records)
 "Adrenalin/Distant Dreams (Part Two)" (1980 Industrial Records)
 "Discipline" (1981 Fetish Records)

Compilations
 Greatest Hits (1980 Rough Trade)
Five Albums Box set (1982 Fetish Records)
Music from the Death Factory Box set (1991 The Grey Area)
Music from the Death Factory 2 Box set (1991 The Grey Area)
TG Box 1 Box set (1991 Alfa Records, Inc)
 The Taste of TG (2004 Mute)
 Mutant Throbbing Gristle (2004 NovaMute)
 20 Jazz Funk Greats, 2CD remastered + bonus CD (2012 Industrial)
 D.o.A : The third and final report of Throbbing Gristle, plus bonus CD (2012 Industrial)

Studio cassette releases

Best of Throbbing Gristle Volume I (1976, Industrial Records)
Best of Throbbing Gristle Volume II (1977, Industrial Records)
Pastimes/Industrial Muzak (1979, Industrial Records)
Beyond Jazz Funk (Nov 1981, Rough Tapes/Rough Trade)

Live releases
See also Throbbing Gristle live performances

Audio:
Heathen Earth (1980 Industrial Records)
Mission of Dead Souls (1981 Fetish Records)
Throbbing Gristle Live, Volume 1: 1976–1978 (1993 The Grey Area)
Throbbing Gristle Live, Volume 2: 1977–1978 (1993 The Grey Area)
Throbbing Gristle Live, Volume 3: 1978–1979 (1993 The Grey Area)
Throbbing Gristle Live, Volume 4: 1979–1980 (1993 The Grey Area)
TG24 1 Hour Sample promo (2002 Industrial Records)
24 hours (1980 Industrial Records)
TG24 Box set (2002 The Grey Area)
TG+ Box set (2004 The Grey Area) 
Live December 2004 A Souvenir of Camber Sands (2004 Mute/Industrial Records)
untitled 3" CD (2005 --)
Distributed to "Uber Ticket" holders of their 29 June 2005 concert. Contains two songs ("What A Day"/"P.A. Destroyer") on a single 15:07 track from the 29 June 2005 concert in Turin, Italy. The CD is a burnt CD-R, hand numbered and limited to 200 copies.
The Desertshore Installation Box set (2007 Industrial Records)
The Thirty-Second Annual Report (2008 Industrial Records)

Video:
Oundle School, 16th March 1980 VHS (1980 Industrial Records) [Live in Peterborough, England]
The Recording Of The Heathen Earth Album VHS (1980 Industrial Records)
Recording Heathen Earth / Live At Oundle School VHS (1983 Doublevision)
Destiny (Lyceum, London, England 8 February 1981) VHS (1990 Jettisoundz)
Mission Of Dead Souls – The Last Live Performance Of TG VHS (1991 Jettisoundz) [Live in Kezar Pavilion, San Francisco, USA 29 May 1981]
TGV 7xDVD Box set (2007 Mute/Industrial Records)

Bootlegs

Studio
Nothing Short Of Total War (Tape) released September 1977, recorded September 1975-May 1977
"23 Drifts To Guestling" (Tape) released 1982, recorded various
Giftgas (CD) released 1994, recorded allegedly September 1975
Kreeme Horn In Praise Of The Grotesque (CD) released 1997, recorded allegedly late 1975 or early 1976
 The First Annual Report (LP/CD) (2001 Thirsty Ear), recorded in 1975

Live
Audio:
Fuhrer Der Menscheit, aka S.O. 36 Berlin (10") 1981
Funeral In Berlin (12") 1981
The Kill: Live At Scala Cinema (12") 1984
Assume Power Focus (12", CD) 1982, 1995
Thee Psychick Sacrifice (2X12") 1981
Rafters/Psychic Rally (12", CD) 1982, 2000
Editions... Frankfurt... Berlin (12") 1983
Mission Is Terminated (2X12") 1983
Once Upon A Time (12", CD) 1984, 1990
Special Treatment (12") 1984
Sacrifice (12") 1986
Live At Death Factory (12") 1980
Funk Beyond Jazz (CD) 1993
At The Highbury Roundhouse, London (CD) 1994
Live At Roundhouse (CD) 1995
Grief (CD) 2001
Blood Pressure (CD) 1995
Dimensia in Excelsis (LP/CD) 1998

Video:
Guildhall, Northampton, England 26 May 1979
Goldsmith College, London, England 13 March 1980
Sheffield University, Sheffield, England 10 June 1980
Kunsthofschule, Frankfurt, W. Germany 10 November 1980
Rafters, Manchester, England 4 December 1980
Heaven, London, England 23 December 1980

Related releases
Video:
Psychic Rally In Heaven (Derek Jarman short film featuring TG live footage and music)
In the Shadow of the Sun (Derek Jarman film with two TG soundtracks)
The Mask Of Sarnath (20 minute Horror film with soundtrack by TG)
After Cease To Exist (The Legendary Coum film)
Genesis TV interview post-Prostitution show

See also
Psychic TV discography

External links

. Retrieved 21 July 2018.

Electronic music discographies
Discographies of British artists